The Privy Council or Secret Council was one of the three "collateral councils" (along with the Council of Finance and Council of State) that together formed the highest government institutions of the Habsburg Netherlands. Based in Brussels, it was particularly charged with legal and administrative questions.

History 
The Council was founded on 1 October 1531 by Emperor Charles V. He prescribed a president, eight councillors, and a secretary.

Philip V of Spain abolished the council in 1702, but it was later restored by the archduchess-governess Maria Christina, Duchess of Teschen and finally abolished by the Brabant Revolution.

Personnel

Presidents 
 1531-1540: Jean Carondelet.
 1531-1540: Pieter Tayspil 
 1540-1548: Lodewijk van Schore
 1549-1569: Viglius van Aytta
 1569-1573: Charles de Tisnacq
 1573-1575: Viglius van Aytta
 1575-1583: Arnoud Sasbout
 1587-1592: Willem van Pamele
 1592-1595: Jan van der Burch
 1597–1609: Jean Richardot
 1614–1630: Engelbert Maes
 1632–1653: Pieter Roose
 1653–1671: Charles de Hovyne
 1672–1684: Léon-Jean de Paepe
 1684-1694: Pieter Frans Blondel
 1694-1702: Albert de Coxie, baron of Moorsele.
 1725-1732: Christophe-Ernest, 1st Count of Baillet
 1733-1739: Jean Alphonse, 1st Count de Coloma
 1739-1758: Gilles-Augustin de Steenhault

Councillors 
 Ferdinand van Boisschot
 Jean Grivel
 Guillaume de Grysperre
 Antoine Reniers
 Louis-Alexander Scockart
 Willem van Steenhuys

Secretary 
 Lodewijk Verreycken
 Lodewijk Frans Verreycken
 Albert Rubens (1614-1657)

See also 
 Council of Brabant
 Council of Flanders
 Council of Luxembourg
 Council of Troubles
 Great Council of Mechelen
 Supreme Council of Flanders

References

Habsburg Netherlands
1531 establishments in the Habsburg Netherlands
Privy councils
Courts and councils in the Burgundian and Habsburg Netherlands